Jason Morningstar is an American indie role-playing game designer, publishing mostly through Bully Pulpit Games. Morningstar's games often lack a Game Master and are often set in situations that quickly go unfortunately for the player characters. Grey Ranks (2007), for example, is about doomed child soldiers in the 1944 Warsaw Uprising, and Fiasco (2009) is about impulsive crooks pulling heists that are sure to go terribly wrong. With these two games, Morningstar became the only named person to have won the Diana Jones award twice as of 2013. Morningstar also works with academia and industry, consulting on using games for teaching and learning in education, with a focus on health sciences.

Games

Jason Morningstar's tabletop role-playing games tend to be GM-less and about things going badly, and published as Bully Pulpit Games.  He has also contributed to supplements for GURPS and Trail of Cthulhu, a nano-game to #Feminism, and several games about healthcare.

The Shab-al-Hiri Roach

The game is a GM-less black comedy lampooning academia, and designed for single-session play at the end of which a winner is determined.  It is set among the internal politics of a buttoned-down New England college campus in 1919, with the titular roach being a soul-eating telepathic insect bent on destroying human civilization.  Characters under the control of the roach succeed at tasks more easily, but can not win if they are still under the control of the roach at the game's end.

The game was originally released in the 2005 Game Chef competition, where It placed in the "Inner Circle."  It was then published in 2006.

Drowning and Falling

Drowning and Falling is a game about dying by drowning and falling, and proceeds from the sale go to ORBIS International.  It was published in 2006.

Grey Ranks

Grey Ranks is a GM-less game about playing child soldiers in the Warsaw Uprising of 1944. The game uses state-of-the art narrativist design to evoke the horrors of war. It was published in 2007 and won the 2008 Diana Jones award. Grey Ranks has been published in Italian and Polish.

Fiasco

Fiasco is a GM-less game for 3-5 players about creating a heist gone wrong. Its focus is on characters as crooks with poor impulse control, inspired by movies such as Fargo. With this game, Morningstar achieves a "dream" in roleplaying design: a satisfying storytelling experience played in a few hours with practically no preparation. Unlike his previous Grey Ranks, Fiasco is readily playable in a variety of settings. It was published in 2009 and won the 2011 Diana Jones award. Fiasco has been published in Italian, French, Spanish, Portuguese, Russian, Korean, and German.

Durance

Durance is a GM-less game for 3-5 players and designed to be played in the spirit of The Prisoner.  It was entered into Game Chef in 2011, and published via Kickstarter in 2012. Durance has been published in Russian.

The Climb

The Climb is a game about ascending a virgin peak in the Himalayas for six players, and comes with a 91-minute soundtrack the game is played to.  It was published in 2013.

Night Witches
Night Witches is a game using the Powered by the Apocalypse engine about Soviet Airwomen in the 588th Night Bomber Regiment. Night Witches unites contemporary gender issues with world war two drama. It was successfully backed on kickstarter in 2014, and delivered in early 2015.

Writing about games

Jason Morningstar also writes about role-playing games.

Beyond the Game Master

The article Beyond the Game Master was published in the Solmukohta book of 2012, States of Play: Nordic Larp Around the World. Solmukohta is a conference where designers talk about Nordic Larp, Live action role-playing game (Larp) in Nordic countries. Nordic Larp is not the same as the larps played in the Nordic countries. Indeed, most Nordic larps are not part of the Nordic Larp design movement. The article Beyond the Game Master discusses various role-playing games without a Gamemaster and their commonalities: Lexicon, Breaking the Ice, Polaris, Archipelago II, Shock: Social Science Fiction, Geiger Counter, Fiasco, Kagematsu, various roleplaying poems and Microscope.

Visual Design as Metaphor
The article Visual Design as Metaphor: The Evolution of A Character Sheet talks about the design of the Character sheet for Jason Morningstar's game about Night Witches, the female military aviators of the 588th Night Bomber Regiment of the Soviet Air Forces.

Gaming community activities
Jason Morningstar organized and judged the Golden Cobra competition, publishing 49 new freeform games, many from new authors.

He has also been a Special Guest at Lucca Comics & Games, Dragoncon, and VikingCon. He has  been a guest at Pyrkon, Ropecon, Wyrdcon and was an industry insider Guest of Honor at Gen Con. as well as many regional events. Morningstar was one of the founding members of Camp Nerdly, an annual, family-friendly role-playing game convention at a campground in Virginia.

References

American game designers
Indie role-playing game designers
Living people
Role-playing game designers
Year of birth missing (living people)